Astronauta is a genus of moths belonging to the subfamily Olethreutinae of the family Tortricidae.

Species

Astronauta astrogenes (Meyrick, 1934)
Astronauta cassiterastra (Meyrick, 1931)
Astronauta gnophera Razowski, 2015
Astronauta sinastra Razowski & Wojtusiak, 2012
Astronauta stellans (Meyrick, 1922)

See also
List of Tortricidae genera

References

External links
tortricidae.com

Tortricidae genera
Olethreutinae
Taxa named by Alexey Diakonoff